Xavier 'Xavi' Moro León (born 22 May 1975) is a Spanish retired footballer who played as a central midfielder who is the current manager of Thai League 1 club Ratchaburi.

Club career
Born in Paris, France, to Spanish immigrants, Moro amassed Segunda División totals of 202 games and 11 goals over the course of eight seasons, representing in the competition FC Barcelona B, CD Badajoz and Lorca Deportiva CF. From January–June 2008 he played in the Superleague Greece, with Iraklis Thessaloniki FC.

Xavi Moro spent 12 years at FC Barcelona since U9 to FC Barcelona B and some games with 1st Team, tallying 464 professional games in his 18 year career. He was coached by Johan Cruyff, Bobby Robson and Jose Mourinho and played with the likes of Ronaldo, Guardiola, Bakero, Figo and many more.

Moro retired in 2014 at the age of 39, after two years as player-coach of amateurs UD Vista Alegre. In 2018 he joins Josep Ferré as an assistant coach Bangkok Glass last for 7 first league matches. Ratchaburi Mitr Phol appointed as Head Coach for the 2022 Thai League season.

Managerial statistics

External links

1975 births
Living people
French people of Spanish descent
Footballers from Paris
Spanish footballers
Association football midfielders
Segunda División players
Segunda División B players
Tercera División players
FC Barcelona C players
FC Barcelona Atlètic players
Córdoba CF players
CE Sabadell FC footballers
CD Castellón footballers
CD Badajoz players
Hércules CF players
Lorca Deportiva CF footballers
Mérida UD footballers
UE Sant Andreu footballers
UE Cornellà players
Super League Greece players
Iraklis Thessaloniki F.C. players
Spain youth international footballers
Spanish expatriate footballers
Expatriate footballers in Greece
Xavi Moro
Xavi Moro